María Carmen López Segura (born 30 March 1946) is a Mexican politician affiliated with the PRI. As of 2013 she served as Deputy of the LXII Legislature of the Mexican Congress representing Baja California as replacement of María Elvia Amaya Araujo.

References

1946 births
Living people
Politicians  from Tijuana
Women members of the Chamber of Deputies (Mexico)
Institutional Revolutionary Party politicians
21st-century Mexican politicians
21st-century Mexican women politicians
Deputies of the LXII Legislature of Mexico
Members of the Chamber of Deputies (Mexico) for Baja California